Tafseer-e-Sagheer (English:The Short Commentary) is the shorter version of Tafseer-e-Kabeer, a 10 volume exegesis of the Quran containing the lectures, writings and notes on Quranic verses by Mirza Mahmood Ahmad, the second  Caliph of the Ahmadiyya Community.

Ahmadi tafsir
Works by Mirza Basheer-ud-Din Mahmood Ahmad
Islamic theology books